Mariastein may refer to:

Mariastein Abbey at Metzerlen-Mariastein, in the canton of Solothurn, Switzerland
Mariastern Abbey, Banja Luka in Banja Luka, Bosnia and Herzegovina
Mariastein, Tyrol, a town in the district of Kufstein in Tyrol, Austria